The Taurosta Bridge is a bridge in Jonava, Lithuania, over which the A6 highway crosses the Neris river. It is the only bridge in the city that can be used by big trucks.

References 
 Bridges of Jonava // Darius Klibavičius. Jonavos tiltai. In: Jonavos rajono laikraštis „Naujienos“. – 2000 m. liepos 11 d., p. 4.

Bridges in Jonava